The Treaty of Aigun (Russian: Айгунский договор) was an 1858 treaty between the Russian Empire and the Qing dynasty that established much of the modern border between the Russian Far East and China by ceding much of Manchuria (the ancestral homeland of the Manchu people), now known as Northeast China. Negotiations began after China was threatened with war on a second front by Governor-General of the Far East Nikolay Muraviev when China was suppressing the Taiping Rebellion. It reversed the Treaty of Nerchinsk (1689) by transferring the land between the Stanovoy Range and the Amur River from the Qing Dynasty to the Russian Empire.

Background
Since the reign of Catherine the Great (1762 – 1796), Russia had desired to become a naval power in the Pacific. It gradually achieved its goals by annexing the Kamchatka Peninsula and establishing the naval outpost of Petropavlovsk-Kamchatsky in 1740, naval outposts in Russian America and near the Amur watershed, encouraging Russians to go there and settle, and slowly developing a strong military presence in the Amur region. 

From 1850 to 1864, when China was heavily involved in suppressing the Taiping Rebellion, and Governor-General of the Far East Nikolay Muraviev camped tens of thousands of troops on the borders of Mongolia and Manchuria, preparing to make legal Russian de facto control over the Amur from past settlement. Muraviev seized the opportunity when it was clear that China was losing the Second Opium War, and threatened China with a war on a second front. The Qing Dynasty agreed to enter negotiations with Russia.

Signing
The Russian representative Muraviev and the Qing representative Yishan, both military governors of the area, signed the treaty on May 28, 1858, in the town of Aigun.

Effects
The resulting treaty established a border between the Russian and Chinese Empires along the Amur River. (Chinese and Manchu residents of the Sixty-Four Villages East of the River would be allowed to remain, under the jurisdiction of Manchu government.) The Amur, Sungari, and Ussuri rivers were to be open exclusively to both Chinese and Russian ships. The territory bounded on the west by the Ussuri, on the north by the Amur, and on the east and south by the Sea of Japan was to be jointly administered by Russia and China—a "condominium" arrangement similar to that which the British and Americans had agreed upon for the Oregon Territory in the Treaty of 1818. (Russia gained sole control of this land two years later.)
The inhabitants along the Amur, Sungari, and Ussuri rivers were to be allowed to trade with each other.
The Russians would retain Russian and Manchu copies of the text, and the Chinese would retain Manchu and Mongolian copies of the text.
All restrictions on trade to be lifted along the border.

Perception in China
In China, especially after the rise of Chinese nationalism in the 1920s, the treaty has been denounced as an unequal treaty.

See also
Convention of Peking
Amur Annexation
Sino-Russian border conflicts
Outer Manchuria
Unequal Treaties
Western imperialism in Asia

References

Unequal treaties
History of Manchuria
19th century in the Russian Empire
Treaties involving territorial changes
1858 in China
China–Russia treaties
Boundary treaties
China–Russia border
1858 treaties
Treaties of the Russian Empire
Treaties of the Qing dynasty
May 1858 events
China–Russian Empire relations